Angel Anne Canino (born June 23, 2003) is a Filipino volleyball player. She played for the Philippines women's national under-23 volleyball team in the 2019 Women's Volleyball Kor Royal Cup held in Thailand.

Personal life 
Canino was born in Bacolod to volleyball coach parents. She studied at Bacolod Tay Tung High School then transferred to De La Salle Santiago Zobel School and played in the UAAP juniors volleyball tournament where she was awarded as one-time Seasons MVP, and two-time Best Outside Hitter. She played twice for the national team in 2019 Women's Volleyball Kor Royal Cup and in 2019 ASEAN School Games.

Awards

Individual
 2017 UAAP Season 80 Juniors "2nd Best Outside Spiker"
 2018 Palarong Pambansa "Most Valuable Player" 
 2018 UAAP Season 81 Juniors "Season's Most Valuable Player"
 2018 UAAP Season 81 Juniors "1st Best Outside Spiker"
 2022 Shakey's Super League Collegiate Pre-Season Tournament "1st Best Outside Spiker"

Collegiate 

 2022 Shakey's Super League Collegiate Pre-Season Tournament –  Silver medal, with De La Salle Lady Spikers

References 

2003 births
Living people
University Athletic Association of the Philippines volleyball players
Sportspeople from Bacolod
De La Salle University alumni
Filipino women's volleyball players
Outside hitters